Robert Vann Williams (born November 21, 1958) is an American football coach who most recently served as the special teams coordinator and tight ends coach at the University of Oregon from 2018 to 2021. Williams served as the head coach at Michigan State University from 1999 to 2002.

Playing career
During his time at Purdue University, between 1978 and 1982, Williams was a four-year letterman for the Boilermakers football team and a captain in his senior season. He started for three years in the secondary, after spending his freshman season at running back. He graduated in 1982 with a degree in general management.

Coaching career
After spending one season as a graduate assistant at his alma mater, Williams got his first coaching position as a running back and secondary coach at Ball State, where he remained for two seasons. He spent the next five seasons as an offensive backfield coach at Eastern Michigan.

On December 6, 1999, Williams was named as the head coach of the Michigan State Spartans football team. Williams coached the Spartans to a 37–34 win over Florida in the 2000 Citrus Bowl in his first game as head coach. In his first full season as head coach, the Spartans began their 2000 season 3–0, with wins over Marshall, Missouri, and Notre Dame, before losing four consecutive and finishing the season 5–6. The Spartans did improve in the following season, though were inconsistent, and finished the regular season 6–5, which included a win versus rival Michigan in the infamous "Clockgate" game. In the 2001 Silicon Valley Football Classic, Michigan State defeated Fresno State 44–35, finishing the season 7–5 and giving Williams his second bowl victory. With the victory, he became the first coach in Spartans history to win his first two bowl games. Nearing the end of his third season, Michigan State was 3–6 and last place in the Big Ten when the Spartans decided to fire Williams as head coach.

After leaving Michigan State, Williams went into the NFL as a wide receiver coach for the Detroit Lions.  During his time with the Lions, he was reunited with wide receiver Charles Rogers, whom he had recruited and coached at MSU. After one season in the NFL, Williams returned to college as a wide receiver coach, as well as an assistant head coach under Nick Saban at LSU. After Saban left LSU for the Miami Dolphins, Williams followed him to become a running back coach for the team several months later. However, after two seasons with the Dolphins, Williams was fired at his position. On January 18, 2008, Williams again rejoined Saban at Alabama, accepting the position of tight end and special teams coordinator.

Personal life
Williams is married to Sheila Williams. The couple has two children: a daughter, Nataly, member of the Theta Sigma chapter of Alpha Kappa Alpha sorority, and  a son, Nicholas who is an offensive quality control coach with the New York Giants.

Head coaching record

*Fired after 9 games.

Notes

References

External links
 Oregon Ducks bio
 Alabama Crimson Tide bio
 

1958 births
Living people
American football defensive backs
American football running backs
Alabama Crimson Tide football coaches
Ball State Cardinals football coaches
Detroit Lions coaches
Eastern Michigan Eagles football coaches
Kansas Jayhawks football coaches
LSU Tigers football coaches
Michigan State Spartans football coaches
Oregon Ducks football coaches
Purdue Boilermakers football players
High school football coaches in Florida
African-American coaches of American football
African-American players of American football
21st-century African-American people
20th-century African-American sportspeople
Players of American football from St. Louis